Tina Salu is a former association football player who represented New Zealand at international level.

Salu made her Football Ferns début as a substitute in a 1–1 draw with Ghana on 21 May 1980. She made just one further appearance, also as a substitute, seven years later, in a 1–3 loss to Chinese Taipei on 13 December 1987.

References

Year of birth missing (living people)
Living people
New Zealand women's international footballers
New Zealand women's association footballers
People educated at Mana College
Women's association footballers not categorized by position